Mitchell Moses (Arabic: ميتشل موسى; born 16 September 1994) is an Australian rugby league footballer who plays as a  for the Parramatta Eels in the NRL. He also plays for the Lebanon national team.

He previously played for the Wests Tigers in the National Rugby League, and has also played for the Australian Prime Minister's XIII and World All Stars sides.

Background
Moses was born in Ryde, New South Wales, Australia on 16 September 1994. He is of Lebanese descent through his mother, and is the nephew of former Balmain Tigers player Benny Elias.

Moses played his junior football for the Holy Cross Rhinos and Carlingford Cougars before being signed by the Parramatta Eels. Moses played for the Eels' Harold Matthews Cup team before being signed by the Wests Tigers. Moses later said, "I went to Parramatta and played Harold Matts there. I wanted to stay there but it's their decision and I respect it."

In 2012, Moses played for the Tigers S. G. Ball Cup team, playing in their grand final win over the Canberra Raiders alongside teammate Luke Brooks, and was named the S. G. Ball Cup Player of the Year. In 2012, Moses played for the Australian Schoolboys. In November 2012, Moses was named in the New South Wales Blues Origin Pathways Camp. Moses played for the Wests Tigers NYC team in 2013 and 2014. In August 2013, Moses re-signed with the Tigers on a 4-year contract. He said, "It wasn't the case that I only stayed because Luke did, but I definitely think I play my best football alongside him."

Playing career

2014
In February, Moses was selected in the Wests Tigers inaugural Auckland Nines squad. In May, he played for the New South Wales in the Under 20s State of Origin match at Penrith Stadium. A late selection at halfback after Luke Brooks withdrew, Moses contributed to four tries in the victory, and was said to have, "directed the team superbly," as they won 30-8. A few days later, he was suspended for 2 matches for calling Luke Bateman a "fucking gay cunt" during the match. Moses had been slated to make his NRL debut the next weekend, but was unable due to his suspension.

In the Tigers last match of the season against the Cronulla-Sutherland Sharks in Round 26, Moses scored his first NRL try in the Tigers 26-10 win at Leichhardt Oval. Moses finished his debut year with 1 try and 2 goals in 10 matches. He made his first 6 NRL appearances at fullback before moving into the halves. It was noted that his first year was "a tough start to life in first-grade for the local junior, particularly as the club imploded on and off the field".

2015
Moses joined Luke Brooks in the halves for 2015. Moses struggled early in the season under the more structured play of new coach Jason Taylor. He said, "I definitely was feeling a little bit frustrated at the start of the year and a bit low on confidence. I'm a freestyle player. That's how I play footy and coming into the structure that JT has bought – now, I don't mind it. It's a good learning curve for me to play to a structure while also being given that freedom of play whenever I see something to take it up." Moses scored his first double in round 15, scoring Wests Tigers' first and last try against Manly. Playing in every game for the year at five-eighth, he was one of three Wests Tigers with 12 or more line-break assists.

2016
With the absence of Robbie Farah and Luke Brooks, Moses was the Tigers' key playmaker for the season opener in Round 1 against the New Zealand Warriors. He was said to have given a "first-half masterclass" as he set up 3 "spectacular" tries during the 34-26 win. Coach Taylor said, "He was such a rookie this time last year. He ran the team for us today, which is a really big step for him." Moses also took over the team's goal-kicking duties, kicking five conversions. He would share goal-kicking with Jordan Rankin as the season progressed. After Robbie Farah was dropped to reserve grade towards the end of the year, it was said, "A large reason for the Tigers' success over the past six weeks has been the form of five-eighth Mitchell Moses, who has been the club's best player over that period." Phil Gould named him as his five-eighth of the year, saying, "His back half of the season has been as good as any player in the game and he only appears to be getting better." Moses finished the season as the club's highest pointscorer with 113 points by scoring 6 tries, 43 goals and 3 field goals in 23 matches. On 7 September, Moses was awarded as the Tigers "Player of the Year". On 24 September, Moses made his representative debut with the Prime Minister's XIII against Papua New Guinea, scoring 3 tries and kicking 4 goals in the 58-0 thrashing win in Port Moresby. At the conclusion of the season Moses was awarded Tigers Player of the Year.

2017
In February, Moses played for the World All Stars against the Indigenous All Stars, starting at five-eighth. Early in the season, Moses, alongside Tigers captain Aaron Woods, halves partner Luke Brooks and fullback James Tedesco, attracted media attention as their contracts all expired at the end of the year. Moses signed a 3-year deal with the Parramatta Eels, starting from 2018. He then asked for an early release from the club to join the Eels, but was denied by the Tigers. After fulltime of the match in round 9, at Leichhardt Oval, a can of beer was thrown onto the field nearly hitting players. Moses was thought to be the intended target of the projectile. On 16 May, he was released from his contract to join the Eels. Moses played in 10 matches, scored 3 tries and kicked 28 goals for the Tigers before switching over to Parramatta.

On May 20, Moses made his Eels debut at halfback in a 16-22 loss to the Canberra Raiders. June 29, Moses kicked a field goal in golden point to win the match against Canterbury 13-12.  On 8 July, he scored his first try for Parramatta in a 22-6 victory over Melbourne. The Eels finished 4th and made their first appearance in the finals since the 2009 NRL Grand Final. Moses played at halfback in the Eels losses to the Melbourne Storm and North Queensland Cowboys as they stumbled out of the finals, the first top 4 team since Manly in 2014 to go out in straight defeats. Moses played in all 26 games of the season, 10 for Wests Tigers and 16 for the Eels, scoring 4 tries, kicking 59 goals and 1 field goal.

Moses was selected as vice-captain of the 24-man squad for Lebanon for the 2017 Rugby League World Cup. In the first pool match against France, Moses had an outstanding match, scoring a try, kicking 4 goals and a field goal in the 29-18 win at Canberra Stadium. Even though Lebanon lost their 3 other pool matches against more experienced teams England, Australia and Tonga, Moses was named at five-eighth in the Team of the Tournament. He played in all 4 matches, scoring 1 try and kicking 8 goals and 1 field goal.

2018
Moses was sin-binned in the first two games of the season.  In round 1, he was sent from the field for a professional foul. In round 2, a 54-0 loss to Manly, he was binned for dissent.  On 5 May, Moses missed a conversion from the sideline which would have taken the game to extra time.  With seven minutes remaining in the match against Cronulla, Parramatta were losing 22-4 when they scored three late tries to make it 22-20 on the full time siren with Moses getting the last try. On 2 June, Moses suffered a knee injury.  It was initially thought that he had suffered a posterior cruciate ligament injury but scans showed no major damage was done and instead he would miss 2-3 matches.  On 19 July, Moses scored the match-winning try in Parramatta's 14-8 victory over arch rivals Canterbury, which the media dubbed the "spoon bowl" as the teams were sitting second last and last on the ladder.
In Round 25, Moses was sent to the sin bin for the third time in the season in Parramatta's 44-10 loss against the Sydney Roosters.

At season's end, Moses was told by Parramatta he was free to join another club. He said, "I'm not sure who wanted me or didn't want me. I'm not going to lie it was upsetting to hear that straight away after the season." Moses remained at the club, with halves partner Corey Norman leaving.

2019
In Round 6, Moses was the first player to score a try, conversion and field goal in the first NRL match played at the new Bankwest Stadium in which Parramatta defeated Wests Tigers 51-6.  The first try to be officially scored at the new stadium was by teammate Bevan French who crossed for the Wentworthville Magpies against Western Suburbs in the Canterbury Cup NSW match played before the main game.

On June 8, Moses signed a three year deal worth $2.5 million, keeping him at the club until the end of the 2022 season.

At the end of the 2019 NRL season, Parramatta finished in 5th place on the table and qualified for the finals.  Moses finished the regular season as the competition's leading try assist maker.  In the elimination final against Brisbane, Moses scored 2 tries and kicked 6 goals as Parramatta won the match 58-0 at the new Western Sydney Stadium.  The victory was the biggest finals win in history, eclipsing Newtown's 55-7 win over St George in 1944.  The match was also Parramatta's biggest win over Brisbane and Brisbane's worst ever loss since entering the competition in 1988.

On 30 September, Moses was named at halfback for the Australia PM XIII side. He was named as the 2019 halfback of the year at the Dally M Awards.

2020
In round 2 Moses scored a try and kicked nine goals as Parramatta defeated the Gold Coast 46-6.

In round 11, Moses returned from injury against the Wests Tigers and scored an amazing solo try as he chipped the ball over the Wests defence and scored under the posts as Parramatta won the match 26-16 at Bankwest Stadium.

At the end of the 2020 regular season, Parramatta finished third on the table and qualified for the finals.  After a 36-24 loss against Melbourne in the qualifying final, Parramatta played against South Sydney in the elimination final at Bankwest Stadium.  With the score in Souths favour at 20-18, Moses had a penalty kick from directly in front of the posts to level the scores at 20-20. Moses proceeded to miss the conversion with the ball striking the post.

South Sydney would capture the rebound and run down the other end of the field to score a try.  Parramatta would go on to lose 38-24 eliminating them from the competition.

2021
In round 6 of the 2021 NRL season, he kicked five goals and one field goal in Parramatta's 35-10 victory over Canberra.

Moses re-signed with Parramatta until the end of 2024.

In round 14, Moses scored a try and kicked seven goals as Parramatta defeated Wests Tigers 40-12.  In the first half of the match, Moses knocked the ball on in the Wests Tigers in goal when he looked certain to score.  It was described as the "Bombed try of the year".

In round 16, Moses missed a penalty goal attempt after the full-time siren against Penrith which would have won the match for Parramatta but the conversion was unsuccessful and Penrith would hold on for a 13-12 victory.

Moses was selected for the NSW Blues as halfback for the third State of Origin game in the 2021 series. It was the first time Moses had represented NSW and his selection came off the back of an injury to Penrith halfback Nathan Cleary in the second game of the series.  New South Wales would go on to lose game 3 20-18 against Queensland with Moses providing two try assists in the match.

On 20 July, it was announced that Moses would be ruled out from playing for an indefinite period after sustaining a back fracture in game 3 of the 2021 State of Origin series.
Moses played a total of 22 games for Parramatta in the 2021 NRL season including both of the club's finals matches against Newcastle and Penrith.  Parramatta were eliminated from the second week of the finals by Penrith in a tough 8-6 loss.  It was the third season in a row that Parramatta had been eliminated from the finals at that stage in the competition.

2022
In round 4 of the 2022 NRL season, Moses scored two tries and kicked eight goals in a man of the match performance as Parramatta defeated St. George 48-14.
In round 14 of the 2022 NRL season, Moses provided one of the bombed tries of the season against arch-rivals Canterbury.  With Parramatta down by 24 points and less than ten minutes to play, Moses broke through the Canterbury line and nonchalantly looked to put the ball down for a try but was unaware Canterbury player Matt Burton was behind him.  Burton knocked the ball out of Moses hand which lead to a knock on.  Canterbury would then go on to win the match 34-4.
Following Parramatta's upset victory over Penrith, it was announced that Moses would be ruled out for five weeks with a broken finger.  Moses was subsequently replaced by Jakob Arthur.
In round 24, Moses scored a try, kicked eight goals and one drop goal in Parramatta's 53-6 victory over Brisbane.
In the 2022 Qualifying Final, Moses was taken from the field in the second half after suffering a head clash in Parramatta's 27-8 loss to Penrith.
The following week in the elimination semi-final, Moses starred for Parramatta scoring a try and kicking six goals in a 40-4 victory over Canberra.  The result meant that Parramatta reached their first preliminary final since 2009.
Moses played 26 games for Parramatta throughout 2022 including their 2022 NRL Grand Final loss to Penrith.

2023
In round 2 of the 2023 NRL season, Moses played his 200th first grade game in Parramatta's 30-26 loss against Cronulla. Moses scored two tries and kicked three goals in the match.

Personal life
Moses has one daughter.

References

External links

Parramatta Eels profile
Wests Tigers profile
2017 RLWC profile

1994 births
Living people
Australian rugby league players
Australian people of Lebanese descent
Prime Minister's XIII players
NRL All Stars players
Wests Tigers players
Parramatta Eels players
New South Wales Rugby League State of Origin players
Rugby league five-eighths
Rugby league fullbacks
Lebanon national rugby league team players
Rugby league players from Sydney